Minan may refer to:
 Minan, Sistan and Baluchestan
 Minan, Zanjan
 Minan Rural District, in Sistan and Baluchestan Province

See also 
 Min'an, a subdistrict in Hunan, China